Kasturbai Mohandas Gandhi (born Kasturbai Gokuldas Kapadia; 11 April 1869 – 22 February 1944) was an Indian political activist. She was married to Mohandas Gandhi, more commonly known as Mahatma Gandhi, in 1883. With her husband and her eldest son, Harilal, she was involved in the Indian independence movement in British India. National Safe Motherhood Day is observed on April 11 every year in India, coinciding with Kasturbai Gandhi's birthday. Mohandas affectionately called her Baa and in letters referred to her as Mrs. Gandhi.

Early life and background
Kasturbai Gokuldas Kapadia was born on 11 April 1869 to Gokuladas Kapadia and Vrajkunwerba Kapadia. The family belonged to the Modh Bania caste of Gujarati Hindu tradesmen and were based in the coastal town of Porbandar. Little is known of Katsurbai's early life. In May 1883, 14-year-old Kasturbai was married to 13-year-old Mohandas in a marriage arranged by their parents, arranged marriage being commonplace and traditional in India. They were married for a total of sixty-two years.

Recalling the day of their marriage, her husband once said, "As we didn't know much about marriage, for us it meant only wearing new clothes, eating sweets and playing with relatives." However, as was prevailing tradition, the adolescent bride was to spend the first few years of marriage  at her parents' house, and away from her husband. Writing many years later, Mohandas described with regret the lustful feelings he felt for his young bride, "even at school I used to think of her, and the thought of nightfall and our subsequent meeting was ever haunting me." At the beginning of their marriage, Mohandas was also possessive and manipulative; he wanted the ideal wife who would follow his command.

Although their other four sons (Harilal, Manilal, Ramdas, and Devdas) survived to adulthood, Katsurbai never fully recovered from the death of her first child. The first two sons were born before Mohandas first went abroad. When he left to study in London in 1888, she remained in India. In 1896 she and their two sons went to live with him in South Africa.

Later on, in 1906, Mohandas took a vow of chastity, or brahamacharya. Some reports indicated that Katsurbai felt that this opposed her role as a traditional Hindu wife. However, Gandhi quickly defended her marriage when a woman suggested she was unhappy. Gandhi's relatives also insisted that the greatest good was to remain and obey her husband, the Mahatma.

Ramachandra Guha's biography Gandhi Before India described the marriage, saying, "They had, in the emotional as well as sexual sense, always been true to one another. Perhaps because of their periodic, extended separations, Kasturba deeply cherished their time together."

Political career

Kasturba Gandhi first involved herself with politics in South Africa in 1904 when, with her husband and others, she established the Phoenix Settlement near Durban. In 1913 she took part in protests against the ill-treatment of Indian immigrants in South Africa, for which she was arrested and on 23 September 1913 was sentenced to hard labour. While in prison, she led other women in prayer and encouraged educated women to teach the uneducated women how to read and write.

Gandhi and Mohandas left South Africa in July 1914 and returned to live in India. In spite of Kasturba’s chronic bronchitis she continued to take part in civil actions and protests across India and often took her husband's spot when he was in prison. The majority of her time was dedicated to helping out and serving in ashrams. Here, Gandhi was referred to as "Ba" or Mother, because she served as mother of the ashrams in India. A point of difference between Gandhi and Mohandas was the treatment of their children in their ashram. Mohandas believed that their sons did not deserve special treatment, while Kasturba felt that Mohandas neglected them.

In 1917, Gandhi worked on the welfare of women in Champaran, Bihar where Mohandas was working with indigo farmers. She taught women hygiene, discipline, health, reading and writing. In 1922, she participated in a Satyagraha (nonviolent resistance) movement in Borsad, Gujarat even though she was in poor health. She did not take part in Gandhi's famous Salt March in 1930, but continued to take part in many civil disobedience campaigns and marches. As a result, she was arrested and jailed on numerous occasions.

In 1939, Gandhi took part in nonviolent protests against the British rule in Rajkot, after the women in the city specifically asked her to advocate for them. Gandhi was arrested once again, and kept in solitary confinement for a month. Her health worsened but she continued to fight for independence. In 1942, she was arrested again, along with Mohandas and other freedom fighters for participating in the Quit India movement. She was imprisoned in the Aga Khan Palace in Pune. By this time her health had severely deteriorated and she died at the detention camp in Pune.

Mohandas wrote of his wife in terms which showed that he always continued to expect obedience from her. "According to my earlier experience, she was very obstinate. In spite of all my pressure she would do as she wished. This led to short or long periods of estrangement between us. But as my public life expanded, my wife bloomed forth and deliberately lost herself in my work."

Health and death

Gandhi suffered from chronic bronchitis due to complications at birth. Her bronchitis was complicated by pneumonia. Her health further deteriorated in January 1908, as she fasted while her husband was in prison, and she became gravely ill. She came so close to death that Mohandas apologised to her, and promised he would not remarry if she were to die.

The British doctors prescribed penicillin, which could cure her, but Mohandas refused to allow an injection of foreign medicine. In January 1944, Gandhi suffered two heart attacks, after which she was confined to her bed much of the time. Even there she found no respite from pain. Spells of breathlessness interfered with her sleep at night. Gandhi asked to see an Ayurvedic doctor, a more familiar form of Indian treatment. After several delays, the government allowed a specialist in traditional Indian medicine to attend to her. At first she responded, recovering enough by the second week in February to sit on the veranda in a wheelchair for short periods and talk with him. Later she suffered a relapse.

She died at the Aga Khan Palace in Pune, at 7:35 PM local time on 22 February 1944, aged 74.

The Kasturba Gandhi National Memorial Trust Fund was set up in her memory. Mohandas requested that this fund be used to help women and children in villages in India.

Legacy
Many institutions, roads, and cities are named after her:
Kasturba Gandhi College for Women
Kasturba Hospital (Wardha)
Kasturba Hospital (Valsad)
Kasturba Medical College, Manipal
Kasturba Nagar railway station
Kasturba Gandhi Balika Vidyalaya
Kasturba Nagar (Delhi Assembly constituency)
Kasturba Gandhi National Memorial Trust
Kasturba Health Society
Kasturba Nagar, Chennai
Kasturba Nagar, Puducherry
Kasturba College for Women, Villianur, Puducherry
Kasturba Road
Kasturba Gandhi Marg, New Delhi.
Kasturba Nagar, Kochi.
Kasturba Nagar, Bhopal.

In popular culture 
Narayan Desai wrote a play, Kasturba, based on Kasturba Gandhi. It was directed by Aditi Desai and was staged several times.

In the 1982 film Gandhi, the role of Kasturba Gandhi was played by Rohini Hattangadi.

See also
 List of civil rights leaders

References

Further reading

External links
 Gandhi and Kasturba
Get to know about Mahatma Gandhi Biography (हिन्दी)

1869 births
1944 deaths
Indian pacifists
Indian independence activists from Gujarat
Gujarati people
Indian rebels
Hindu pacifists
Kasturba
Gandhians
People from Porbandar
Deaths from pneumonia in India
Deaths from bronchopneumonia
Indian emigrants to South Africa
19th-century Indian women
19th-century Indian people
20th-century Indian women
20th-century Indian people
Women Indian independence activists
Women from Gujarat
Colony of Natal people